The Baeyer–Emmerling indole synthesis is a method for synthesizing indole from a (substituted) ortho-nitrocinnamic acid and iron powder in strongly basic solution. This reaction was discovered by Adolf von Baeyer and Adolph Emmerling in 1869.

Reaction mechanism
The reaction of iron powder with o-nitrocinnamic acid reduces the nitro group to a nitroso. The nitrogen then condenses with a carbon on the alkene chain with loss of a molecule of water to form a ring. Decarboxylation gives indole.

See also
 Baeyer–Drewson indigo synthesis

References

Indole forming reactions
Organic reactions
Name reactions